Edward Sanders Foster (March 28, 1949 – July 26, 2008) was an American columnist for InfoWorld, best remembered for his Gripelog column in InfoWorld, and his work opposing UCITA. Foster worked at InfoWorld as a reporter, writer, editor, and publication executive for over 20 years. In 1993 he launched his popular column, "The Gripe Line", which later became an ongoing blog.

Foster had a son, Jeff.

References

External links
Ed Foster's Gripelog
 InfoWorld columnist Ed Foster dies
 In Memoriam: Ed Foster, 1949-2008

1949 births
2008 deaths
American male journalists
20th-century American journalists